James Brown and His Famous Flames Tour the U.S.A. is the fifth studio album by American musician James Brown and The Famous Flames. The album was released in 1962, by King Records.

Track listing
All tracks composed by James Brown; except where indicated

References

1962 albums
James Brown albums
The Famous Flames albums
Albums produced by James Brown
King Records (United States) albums